Nándor von Orbán (10 February 1910 – 10 February 1981) was a Hungarian modern pentathlete. He competed at the 1936 Summer Olympics.

References

External links
 

1910 births
1981 deaths
People from Kecskemét
Hungarian male modern pentathletes
Olympic modern pentathletes of Hungary
Modern pentathletes at the 1936 Summer Olympics
Sportspeople from Bács-Kiskun County
20th-century Hungarian people